Hotel Luna, Room 34 (Italian: Albergo Luna, camera 34) is a 1946 Italian crime melodrama film directed by Carlo Ludovico Bragaglia and starring Chiaretta Gelli, Carlo Campanini and Andrea Checchi.

It was produced by Lux Film, and earned 39 million lira at the box office.

Cast
 Chiaretta Gelli as Bianca Morelli  
 Carlo Campanini as Paolo Gualtieri  
 Andrea Checchi as Andrea Esposito  
 Roberto Villa as Enrico Landi  
 Arturo Bragaglia as Lorenzetti - the double bass player  
 Marcello Giorda as Martini - the impresario 
 Giovanni Petrucci
 Giovanni Dolfini 
 Antonio Bracci 
 Guido Lauri

References

Bibliography
 Chiti, Roberto & Poppi, Roberto. Dizionario del cinema italiano: Dal 1945 al 1959. Gremese Editore, 1991.
 Hischak, Thomas S. . The Encyclopedia of Film Composers. Rowman & Littlefield, 2015.

External links

1946 films
Italian crime drama films
1946 crime drama films
1940s Italian-language films
Films directed by Carlo Ludovico Bragaglia
Lux Film films
Italian black-and-white films
Melodrama films
1940s Italian films